NASA has operated several cameras on spacecraft over the course of its history.

Apollo Program 
Apollo TV camera
Hasselblad "Electric Camera" (modified 500 EL) with 70 mm film
 Maurer Data Acquisition Camera (DAC) with 16 mm film
Nikon with 35 mm film
Mapping (Metric) Camera (7.6 cm focal length) with 127 mm film, on Apollo 15, 16, and 17 (see Sherman Fairchild#Lunar photography)
Stellar Camera (7.6 cm focal length) with 35 mm film, on Apollo 15, 16, and 17
Panoramic Camera (61 cm focal length) with 127 mm film, on Apollo 15, 16, and 17

Skylab
Personal camera equipment:
Television camera
16 mm film video camera
35 mm film camera
70 mm film camera

Space Shuttle program 
 Space Shuttle booster cameras.
 Space Shuttle External Tank camera
 Columbia
 Shuttle Infrared Leeside Temperature Sensing experiment
Nikon NASA F4

Lunar missions 
 Pioneer program, 1958–1960
 Pioneer 1, television camera
 Pioneer 2, television camera
 Lunar Orbiter program, Lunar Orbiter 1–5, 1966–1967
The camera used two lenses to simultaneously expose a wide-angle and a high-resolution image on the same film. The wide-angle, medium resolution mode used an 80 mm F 2.8 Xenotar lens manufactured by Schneider Kreuznach, Germany. The high-resolution mode used a 610 mm F 5.6 Panoramic lens manufactured by the Pacific Optical Company. The film was developed on-orbit, and then scanned by a photomultiplier for transmission to Earth.
 Clementine, 1994
 Ultraviolet/Visible camera (UV/Vis)
 Near-Infrared camera (NIR)
 High-Resolution Camera (HIRES)
 Lunar Precursor Robotic Program, 2009
 Lunar Reconnaissance Orbiter
 Lunar Reconnaissance Orbiter Camera (LROC)
 Lunar Crater Observation and Sensing Satellite
 One visible, two near infrared, and two mid-infrared cameras
 Gravity Recovery and Interior Laboratory, 2011
 Moon Knowledge Acquired by Middle school students (MoonKAM)

Other missions 
Hazcam
Navcam
Pancam
Cachecam

See also
List of cameras on ISS
Nikon NASA F4

References

cameras on spacecraft

Cameras